Peter Philip Laviolette Jr. (born December 7, 1964) is an American professional ice hockey coach, and former player, currently serving as head coach for the Washington Capitals. He was previously the head coach of the New York Islanders, Carolina Hurricanes, Nashville Predators, and Philadelphia Flyers. He led the Hurricanes to a Stanley Cup win in 2006, and later coached the Flyers to the Stanley Cup Finals in 2010, and the Predators in 2017. Laviolette is the fourth coach in NHL history to lead three teams to the Stanley Cup Finals. He played twelve NHL games, all with the New York Rangers.

On October 13, 2021, Laviolette won his 647th game as an NHL head coach, passing John Tortorella to become the winningest American-born head coach in league history. In February 2022, Laviolette became only the 10th head coach in NHL history to record his 700th win.

Laviolette was born in Franklin, Massachusetts, and attended Franklin High School, where he played baseball and hockey. He played college ice hockey at Westfield State College in Westfield, Massachusetts.

Playing career
As a player, Laviolette spent the majority of his ten-year career playing for various minor league teams. He played 12 games in the NHL for the New York Rangers during the  season, but failed to record a point. Laviolette also played for the United States in the Olympics twice (1988 and 1994).

Coaching career

He began his coaching career as head coach of the ECHL Wheeling Nailers. In one season as coach, he led his team to a 37–24–9 record and a berth in the playoffs, wherein they lost in the third round.  He left Wheeling to take over the head coaching job for the Providence Bruins of the American Hockey League (AHL). In 1998–99, he coached the team to a 56–15–4 regular-season record. In the playoffs, Providence won the AHL Calder Cup Championship with a 15–4 playoff record. Laviolette was named the AHL Coach of the Year.

Laviolette's success in the AHL earned him a stint as an assistant coach for the Boston Bruins. Having grown up in the Boston suburb of Franklin, Laviolette was disappointed when he did not get the head coaching job in Boston after that season so he left for the head coaching job on Long Island.

New York Islanders
He became head coach of the  New York Islanders in 2001. After taking over the New York Islanders, which had missed the playoffs for seven years prior to his arrival, he led his team to the playoffs in both seasons he was there. His first season in New York, the Islanders earned 96 points (42–28–8–4 record), nearly winning the Atlantic Division before losing in the first round to the Toronto Maple Leafs in seven games. The Islanders sneaked into the playoffs the following season and then lost in five games to the Ottawa Senators in the first round. He was fired by general manager Mike Milbury soon after.

Carolina Hurricanes
Laviolette came to the Carolina Hurricanes as head coach in the 2003–04 season, taking over following the firing of Paul Maurice. In his first season, he coached 52 games during a rebuilding year. Laviolette led the Hurricanes to an excellent regular season during his second year at the helm, winning the Southeast Division with 112 points (52–22–8 record). He also coached the U.S. Olympic men's hockey team at the 2006 Winter Olympics in Turin, Italy. The Hurricanes won their first Stanley Cup championship in franchise history during the 2006 playoffs, after winning two very close seven-game playoff series over the Buffalo Sabres and Edmonton Oilers. Laviolette was only the fourth American-born coach to win it. He was also the runner-up for the Jack Adams Award for the NHL's Coach of the Year, which was awarded to Lindy Ruff in the closest vote ever recorded for this award, 155–154.

After winning their first Stanley Cup, Laviolette's Hurricanes suffered through an injury-plagued 2006–07 season that saw the team finish with a disappointing 40–34–8 record. The next season, the team once again got off to a poor start, but held first place in a weak division for most of the season, despite having a sub-.500 record until February. The team then got hot and built what was seen as a solid lead. However, the Washington Capitals got red hot in the final weeks, Carolina lost several games down the stretch, and Laviolette's group missed the post-season.

On November 7, 2008, following his 240th victory, Laviolette moved past John Tortorella to become the winningest American-born coach in the NHL. Tortorella later eclipsed this record in 2009, and after several years of being within a few wins of each other, Laviolette regained the lead in 2021 while coaching the Washington Capitals.

On December 3, 2008, Laviolette was fired as coach of the Hurricanes and replaced by his predecessor, Paul Maurice.

Laviolette worked on the panel for the TV network TSN.

Philadelphia Flyers
On December 4, 2009, Laviolette replaced John Stevens as the head coach of the Philadelphia Flyers. Barely making it into the playoffs thanks to a shootout victory over rival New York Rangers, Laviolette's Flyers became only the third ever NHL team to come back from a 3–0 series deficit, defeating the Boston Bruins 4–3 in Game 7 to reach the 2010 Eastern Conference Finals. On May 24, 2010, Laviolette led the Flyers to the Stanley Cup Finals against the Chicago Blackhawks. The Flyers would lose the Finals in six games, with Chicago winning the Cup in overtime on June 9.

On April 1, 2012, in a game against the Pittsburgh Penguins, Laviolette jawed with the Penguins' head coach Dan Bylsma after Penguin Joe Vitale hit Flyer Daniel Brière late in the game. Laviolette swung a stick against the boards which broke in half, and continued to verbally go after Bylsma and assistant coach Tony Granato, an American teammate of Laviolette during the 1988 Winter Olympics.

The HBO series 24/7: Flyers/Rangers leading up to the 2012 Winter Classic gave fans rare access to the Flyers locker room, and many of Laviolette's quotes became popular catch-phrases, such as, "We need to start playing with some jam," and, "It's about as casual as it gets." Laviolette himself acknowledged the popularity of his "jam" catch-phrase by making a video for the Flyers 2012 Fan Appreciation Game thanking Philadelphia fans for "bringing more jam than any other city in sports."  For the Flyers' Game 6 Eastern Conference Quarter-final game against the Pittsburgh Penguins, the Flyers gave away orange shirts to all fans attending featuring an angry likeness of Laviolette and the phrase, "Time for some JAM!!"

After a 0–3 start of the 2013–14 season by the Flyers, Laviolette was fired October 7, 2013. He was replaced by assistant coach Craig Berube.

Nashville Predators
On May 6, 2014, Laviolette was hired to become the head coach of the Nashville Predators, becoming only the team's second coach in history. He replaced Barry Trotz, who served 15 years as head coach of the Predators and the only coach the franchise had seen. Laviolette and his Nashville staff were chosen to coach one of the teams in the 2015 NHL All-Star Game for having the highest points percentage in the NHL through January 8, 2015. Laviolette guided the Predators to a franchise record ninth consecutive home win with a 4–3 victory over the Toronto Maple Leafs on February 4, 2015.  During the 2015-16 season, Laviolette guided the Predators to a new franchise record 14-game point streak.  The team qualified for the Stanley Cup playoffs but lost to the San Jose Sharks in the second round.

In 2017, the Predators again qualified for the playoffs as second wild card spot with 94 points. In the first round the team swept the Chicago Blackhawks 4–0, marking the first time that an eighth seed swept a playoff series against the top seed in the conference in National Hockey League history. In the second round, the Predators defeated the St. Louis Blues in six games, marking the first time the team advanced to the Western Conference Finals. On May 16, the Predators beat the Anaheim Ducks in game 3 of the Western Conference Finals and became the first team in 20 years (since the Detroit Red Wings in 1997) to achieve 10 straight wins at home in the postseason. On May 22, 2017, Laviolette guided the Predators to the franchise's first Western Conference Championship by beating the Ducks 6–3 to move on to the Stanley Cup Finals. After going down to the Pittsburgh Penguins 2–0, the Predators evened the series at 2, winning games 3 and 4 at home. Returning to Pittsburgh, the Predators lost 6–0 before being eliminated at home 2–0 in game 6 of the Stanley Cup Finals on June 11, 2017.

Laviolette was fired by the Predators on January 6, 2020, with the team sitting at sixth place in the division at the time with a record of 19–15–7.

Washington Capitals
On September 15, 2020, Laviolette was named head coach of the Washington Capitals, replacing the recently fired Todd Reirden.

Honors, awards, distinctions
On February 26, 2020, Laviolette was named head coach of the United States men's national team.

Personal life
Laviolette and his wife Kristen have two sons and one daughter.

Career statistics

Regular season and playoffs

International

Head coaching record

References

External links

 

1964 births
Living people
American ice hockey coaches
American men's ice hockey defensemen
Binghamton Rangers players
Boston Bruins coaches
Carolina Hurricanes coaches
Colorado Rangers players
Denver Rangers players
ECHL coaches
Flint Spirits players
Ice hockey coaches from Massachusetts
Ice hockey players at the 1988 Winter Olympics
Ice hockey players at the 1994 Winter Olympics
Indianapolis Checkers players
Nashville Predators coaches
New York Islanders coaches
New York Rangers players
Olympic ice hockey players of the United States
People from Norwood, Massachusetts
Philadelphia Flyers coaches
Providence Bruins players
San Diego Gulls (IHL) players
Stanley Cup champions
Stanley Cup championship-winning head coaches
Undrafted National Hockey League players
United States men's national ice hockey team coaches
Washington Capitals coaches
Westfield State University alumni
Ice hockey players from Massachusetts